Akurio may refer to:
 Akurio people, an ethnic group of Suriname
 Akurio language, a Cariban language

See also 
 Acurio

Language and nationality disambiguation pages